Homosexual Behaviour: Therapy and Assessment is a 1971 book about conversion therapy by the psychologist M. P. Feldman and the psychiatrist M. J. MacCulloch. The work was positively reviewed.

Summary

Feldman, a psychologist, and MacCulloch, a psychiatrist, discuss the use of a learning technique to treat homosexual behaviour. They also provide what they describe as a "frankly speculative" attempt to combine different evidence to produce an account of "the development and maintenance of homosexual behaviour" as well as the motivations for and responses to treatment.

Publication history
Homosexual Behaviour: Therapy and Assessment was published by Pergamon Press in 1971.

Reception
Homosexual Behaviour: Therapy and Assessment received a positive review from John Johnson in the British Journal of Psychiatry. Johnson wrote that behavior therapy for the treatment of "sexual deviation" had a record of success, and described Homosexual Behaviour: Therapy and Assessment as "a work of considerable value and practical application." He credited Feldman and MacCulloch with presenting a good discussion of the development of their technique, but noted that a high proportion of their patients had requested treatment following court referral, and argued that their success rates may have been affected by the desire of this sample to claim to have become heterosexual. He described their discussion of "the biological aspects of homosexuality" as "speculative".

The neuroscientist Simon LeVay wrote that Feldman and MacCulloch's study of attempts to change homosexuality through aversion therapy was followed by others. According to LeVay, the authors of some of these studies argued that Feldman and MacCulloch's claims of success were exaggerated and that men who had apparently become heterosexual through aversion therapy reverted to homosexuality within a few months. Others argued that Feldman and MacCulloch had not used the best techniques.

See also
 Conversion therapy
 Sexual orientation change efforts

References

Bibliography
Books

 
 

Journals

 

1971 non-fiction books
Books about conversion therapy
English-language books
Pergamon Press books